Mníšek pod Brdy is a town in Prague-West District in the Central Bohemian Region of the Czech Republic. It has about 6,100 inhabitants. The town centre and Skalka area are well preserved and are protected by law as an urban monument zone.

Geography
The town is a part of the Prague metropolitan area. It is located mostly in the Benešov Uplands, the northern part of the municipal territory extends into the Brdy Highlands. A set od ponds fed by the Bojovský Stream is located in the centre of the town, the largest body of water is Sýkorník Pond east of the built-up area.

History

The first written mention of Mníšek pod Brdy is from 1348, when existence of the castle is mentioned.

Transport
The D4 motorway runs through Mníšek pod Brdy. The town is served by two railway stations on the railway line from Prague to Dobříš.

Sport
Mníšek pod Brdy hosts an annual cross-country ultramarathon of 50 km length, which is part of the European Ultramarathon Cup.

Sights
Mníšek pod Brdy Castle is the main landmark of the town and its oldest building. It contains a pond and a small castle park.

The Church of Saint Wenceslaus is a landmark of central town's square. It was built in 1743–1756 by an unknown architect on the place of a church which was burned down by the Swedish Army in 1639.

It was built by local nobleman Servác Ignác Engel in the 17th century. It includes the Chapel of Saint Mary Magdalene, a monastery, Stations of the Cross, and a hermitage.

References

External links

 (in Czech)

Cities and towns in the Czech Republic